The following is a list of 2020 box office number-one films in South Korea. When the number-one film in gross is not the same as the number-one film in admissions, both are listed.

The box office dropped in February after the COVID-19 pandemic in South Korea. Some films were postponed.

See also
List of South Korean films of 2020

References

2020
South Korea
2020 in South Korean cinema